Dreaming is an album by the American jazz saxophonist and vocalist Grace Kelly. It was released January 1, 2005.
 
Dreaming is Kelly's debut studio album, recorded when she was 12 years old. It features six originals and six standards.

Track listing
"Dreaming" - (3:09)
"On My Way Home" - (3:03)
"Smile" - (3:32)
"Baby, Baby" (Instrumental) - (3:38)
"Blue Skies/ In Walked Bud" - (3:23)
"Tinkerbell" - (4:19)
"Straighten Up and Fly Right" - (1:41)
"Baby, Baby" - (3:04)
"Can't Buy Me Love" - (4:27)
"G-Bop" - (4:05)
"Stardust" - (3:58)
"One By One" - (5:59)

Personnel
Grace Kelly - Vocals, Alto Saxophone
John Lockwood- Bass
Ken Berman - Piano (1, 2, 4, 6, 8)
Doug Johnson - Piano (3, 5, 7, 9, 10, 11, 12)
Guy Goodwin - Drums (1, 2, 4, 6, 8)
Jordan Perlson - Drums (3, 5, 7, 9, 10, 11, 12)
David Eure - Violin (2)

References

External links
allmusic review

2005 debut albums
Grace Kelly (musician) albums